Carlos Javier may refer to:
 Carlos Javier (comics)
 Carlos Javier (footballer)